The San Francisco Marriott Marquis is a  39-story skyscraper in the South of Market neighborhood of San Francisco, California. Situated at the intersection of Fourth and Mission Streets, across from the Metreon and Moscone Convention Center, the building is recognizable by the distinctive postmodern appearance of its high-rise tower. The building  was completed in 1989, and contains 1,500 hotel rooms. The original architectural firm Zeidler Partnership Architects was replaced by DMJM architect Anthony J Lumsden, who gave the building its overall architectural style. The San Francisco Marriott is the second tallest hotel in San Francisco, after Hilton San Francisco Tower I.

The hotel was at the heart of the city of San Francisco's development of the central blocks in the South of Market area during the late 1970s and early 1980s. The city had put out an invitation to property developers to come up with ideas for the area. Ten developers originally responded and the eventual proposal chosen - in October 1980 - was a joint effort by Marriott together with the Canadian property developers Olympia and York. 

The Marriott Marquis opened on October 17, 1989, the day of the Loma Prieta earthquake. With better earthquake proofing than several nearby hotels, the building only lost a single window.

The San Francisco Marriott Marquis is one of eight Marriott International hotels in the city along with Courtyard San Francisco Downtown, Courtyard San Francisco Fisherman's Wharf, San Francisco Marriott Fisherman's Wharf, San Francisco Marriott Union Square, JW Marriott San Francisco Union Square, Hotel Adagio, and the Ritz-Carlton, San Francisco.

In popular culture
Local newspaper columnist Herb Caen complained that reflections from the hotel's windows blinded him in his office at the nearby Chronicle building, and compared its shape to that of a jukebox.

See also

 San Francisco's tallest buildings

References
Notes

Further reading

External links

 San Francisco Marriott Marquis official website

Hotel buildings completed in 1989
Marriott hotels
Skyscraper hotels in San Francisco
South of Market, San Francisco